The Haberdashers' Boys' School (commonly referred to as Habs) is a British independent school for pupils aged 4 to 18 in Hertfordshire which is a member of the Headmasters' and Headmistresses' Conference and the Haileybury Group.

Former students at Haberdashers' are referred to as Old Haberdashers. A number of former Haberdashers' students have entered the comedy and acting professions, of whom Sacha Baron Cohen, Matt Lucas and Jason Isaacs are particularly prominent.

Haberdashers' has also produced a number of statesmen and others in the political sphere, with the former Minister for the Cabinet Office and Chancellor of the Duchy of Lancaster, David Lidington, and former Home Secretary, Leon Brittan (Baron Brittan of Spennithorne), being former pupils of the School. The historian Simon Schama, a frequent contributor to television and radio programmes, and the late Brian Sewell, 'Britain's most famous and controversial art critic', are also Old Haberdashers' of the School.

Politics

 The Rt Hon Lord Brittan of Spennithorne, QC, DL
 Roy W Brown, former President of the International Humanist and Ethical Union, now its Chief Representative to UN
 The Rt Hon Lord Feldman of Elstree, Conservative Party Chairman
 Lance Forman (Anisfeld), former MEP 
 The Rt Hon Lord Foulkes of Cumnock
 The Lord Harris of Haringey, Labour politician and former President of the Cambridge Union
 The Hon Daniel Levy, lobbyist and one of the architects of the Geneva Accord
 The Rt Hon Sir David Lidington, KCB, CBE, Minister for the Cabinet Office and Chancellor of the Duchy of Lancaster from January 2018 to July 2019, Conservative MP
 Alderman Ian Luder CBE, 681st Lord Mayor of the City of London
 Sir Henry Phillips CMG, MBE (1914–2004), colonial administrator
 Daniel Taub,  former Israeli Ambassador to the UK
 Frederick Augustus Voigt, 1892–1957, known for his work with the Manchester Guardian and his opposition to dictatorship and totalitarianism on the Continent 
 Matt Warman MP
 The Rt Hon Lord Wills
 Tony Kerpel, former Conservative politician and adviser

Scientists

 Professor  Sir Michael Stratton, Director of the Wellcome Sanger Institute and Chief Executive Office of the Wellcome Genome Campus
 Sir Richard Treisman FRS, Research Director of the Francis Crick Institute

Academia

 
 Professor John Bamborough, Founder of Linacre College, Oxford
 Professor Jeremy Black, historian and broadcaster
 Andrew Donald Booth (1918–2009), computer pioneer
 Dr. Alan J. Charig (1927–1997), paleontologist
 Geoffrey Crossick PhD FRHistS, Professor of the Humanities, School of Advanced Study, University of London. Formerly Vice-Chancellor of London University 2010–2012
 Professor Sir Simon Baron-Cohen, Fellow - Trinity College, Cambridge
 Mark Damazer CBE, former Master of St Peter's College, Oxford and former Controller of BBC Radio 4
 Dr Anthony Freeling, President of Hughes Hall, Cambridge
 Sir Ralph Freeman (1880–1950), engineer and architect of the Sydney Harbour Bridge
 Professor  George Garnett, Professor of Medieval History and former Senior Proctor, the University of Oxford
 Dr. Laurence Godfrey, physicist, lecturer and technical consultant/expert witness in internet-related litigation
 Professor Lawrence Goldman, former Director of the Institute of Historical Research
 I.J. Good (1916–2009), mathematician and code breaker at Bletchley Park
 Professor Albert E. Green FRS, applied mathematician
 Professor David Latchman CBE, Master of Birkbeck, University of London
 The Lord Mendoza, Provost of Oriel College, Oxford
 Peter Oppenheimer, economist
 John Rutherford, fellow in Spanish and director of the Centre for Galician Studies at The Queen's College, Oxford, translator of Don Quixote
 Professor Sir Simon Schama CBE, historian
 Emeritus Professor Ian Swingland OBE DSc, founder of the Durrell Institute of Conservation and Ecology at the University of Kent
 Adam Thirlwell, author, Fellow of All Souls' College, Oxford
 Professor John Urry, sociologist

Musicians

 Alexander S. Bermange (born 1976), composer and lyricist
 Erran Baron Cohen (born 1968), composer and trumpet player
 Edric Cundell (1893–1961), conductor and composer
 Isidore Godfrey (1900–1977), conductor of the D'Oyly Carte Opera Company
 Jim Harris, lead vocals and trumpet in Fat and Frantic
 Peter Perrett (born 1952), composer and lyricist for The Only Ones
 Chris Squire (1948–2015), musician in progressive rock band Yes
 Roderick Williams OBE, operatic baritone, composer and broadcaster
 Richard Wright (1943–2008), keyboardist, vocalist and songwriter in Pink Floyd

Arts

 Darien Angadi (1949–1981), actor and boy soprano
 Ben Ashenden writer, actor and comedian
 David Baddiel, comedian and novelist
 Sacha Baron Cohen, comedian (aka Ali G, Borat, or Brüno), actor, Academy Award Nominee, Golden Globe nominee, Screen Actors Guild Award nominee
 Ashley Blaker, comedian and broadcaster
 Derek Bond, Derek William Douglas Bond MC (1920–2006) was a British actor, Officer (World War II), director and playwright
 Simon Boswell, film score composer
 Peter Bradshaw, author and film critic
 Michael John Bukht, OBE (1941–2011), the "Crafty Cook" from the BBC2 television show Food and Drink who went by the name Michael Barry
 Dean Craig, film writer (Death at a Funeral)
 Paul Darrow (1941–2019), actor
 Roger Deakin, English writer, documentary-maker and environmentalist
 Malcolm Edwards, science fiction editor and critic
 David Elstein, founder and CEO of Channel 5 and Chairman of Opendemocracy.net
 Adam Gee, BAFTA-winning interactive media producer
 Malcolm Guite, poet, priest, singer-songwriter, currently Bye-Fellow and Chaplain of Girton College, Cambridge
 Jason Isaacs, actor, played Lucius Malfoy in the Harry Potter series
 Adam Jacobs, photographer
 Kumail Jaffer, journalist
 Mark Kermode, film critic
 Matt Lucas, comedian, actor, writer and TV presenter
 Andrew Miller journalist and author
 Oscar Moore, author. His partly autobiographical novel, A Matter of Life and Sex, made mention of the school.
 Jonny Persey, film producer
 A. D. Peters (1892–1973), literary agent
 Jay Rayner, food critic, author
 Jonathan Scott-Taylor, actor most notable for playling Damien Thorn in Damien: Omen II
 Sir Nicholas Serota, director of Tate Galleries (1988–present)
 Brian Sewell (1931–2015), "Britain's most famous and controversial art critic"
 William Sutcliffe, author of New Boy, a fictional book inspired by his experiences at the school
 Michael Wojas (1956–2010), owner and proprietor of The Colony Room Club in Soho, London
 Gabriel Woolf, film, radio and television actor
 Revishaan (Ishaan Bhimjiyani)

Business

 Michael Green (born 1947), founder of Carlton Television
 Herman Narula, co-founder and CEO of Improbable
 Sir Martin Sorrell, CEO of WPP plc  (1986–2018)
 Tim Steiner, businessman, CEO of Ocado
 Joshua Stevens, entrepreneur and CEO of OneRetail Group
 John Vincent, co-founder and CEO of Leon Restaurants

Sport

 Myles Anderson, professional football player
 Benedict Bermange, cricket statistician
 Julian Goater, athlete
 Damon Hill OBE, F1 World Champion, racing driver
 Dilan Markanday, professional footballer
 Victor Matthews, Commonwealth (1958) and Olympic (1960) athlete, AAA Champion (1959)
 Roger Moulding, former cricketer
 David Price, former cricketer
 Michael Yeabsley, former cricketer
 Richard Yeabsley, former cricketer
 Scott Spurling, professional rugby player, U20 Eng World Cup winner 2013, Junior Commonwealth Games 7s Gold Medalist 2011

Broadcasting

 Dotun Adebayo, BBC journalist and presenter of Up All Night on BBC Radio 5 Live
 Nick Goldsmith, film and TV producer
 Peter Kosminsky, writer and film director
 Zac Lichman, Big Brother (UK) Contestant ('Ziggy') 2007 and member of boyband Northern Line
 Dan Mazer, TV producer
 Adam Parsons, BBC journalist
 Robert Popper, producer and author under the pseudonym Robin Cooper
 Matthew Price, journalist and Chief Correspondent for BBC Radio 4 Today programme
 Aris Roussinos, Vice News journalist
 Ian Toynton, television director, producer and editor
 David Tyler (aka David Meek) (born 1961), TV and radio producer
 Alan Whicker CBE (1925–2013), journalist and broadcaster

See also

References

List